Shabaana A. Khader is an Indian-American microbiologist who is the Theodore and Berta Endowed Professor of Molecular Microbiology at the Washington University in St. Louis. She is also Chair of the Department of Microbiology. In an effort to design new vaccines and therapeutic strategies, Khader studies host-pathogen interactions in infectious disease.

Early life and education 
Khader grew up in India. She attended Bharathidasan University, where she earned an undergraduate degree in zoology in 1995. She completed an undergraduate degree in biomedical genetics at the University of Madras. She was a doctoral researcher in biotechnology at the Madurai Kamaraj University. Her research considered host-pathogen interactions during leprosy, a disease caused by mycobacteria. After earning her doctorate in 2004, she was a postdoc at the Trudeau Institute, working on host-immune responses in tuberculosis. At Trudeau, Khader demonstrated that the cytokine Interleukin-17 played a critical role in vaccine-induced immunity to the infectious disease tuberculosis. She studied and described the role Interleukin 12 (IL-12) cytokines play in tuberculosis infection.

Research and career 
Khader joined the University of Pittsburgh in 2007 and studied mycobacterium tuberculosis and francisella tularensis and the role of cytokines in immunity. Khader moved her research team to Washington University in St. Louis in 2013. In 2022, Khader was appointed chair of the Department of Microbiology.

Khader's research considers the complex host-pathogen interactions that take place in infectious disease. In these interactions, the bacterium can escape the granuloma, spreading as a pathogenic organism throughout a host. She looks to inform the design of new diagnostic tests and novel vaccines.

Awards and honors 
 2021 Elected Fellow of American Society for Microbiology
 2021 Executive Leadership in Academic Medicine Program

Selected publications

References 

Living people
Madurai Kamaraj University alumni
University of Madras alumni
Washington University in St. Louis faculty
Microbiologists
Indian emigrants to the United States
Year of birth missing (living people)